Ubuntu Cape Town FC is a South African football club. The club plays in the National First Division.

The club was created when the Ubuntu Football Trust purchased the franchise license of FC Cape Town in 2017.

References 

Soccer clubs in South Africa
Association football clubs established in 2017
Premier Soccer League clubs